Palau Marathon is an annual marathon race in the Pacific island state of Palau, which has been organized by the Palau Track and Field Association since 2004. The route varies, in 2017 the marathon started in Ngardmau and led over the Koror-Babeldaob Bridge at 20 miles to the finish on the beach of the Palau Pacific Resort on Ngerekebesang Island.

Statistics

References 

Recurring sporting events established in 2004
Marathons in Oceania